KZLK (106.3 FM, "Z106.3") is a commercial radio station licensed to Rapid City, South Dakota. As of January 1, 2019, the station is owned by Riverfront Broadcasting, LLC of Yankton, South Dakota. It's broadcasting an 80's hits format.

History
In March 2018, the station rebranded from She 106.3 to Star 106.3, with no change in format.

On June 1, 2020, KZLK changed their format from hot adult contemporary to 1980's hits, branded as "Z106.3".

Previous logo

References

External links

ZLK
Radio stations established in 2001
2001 establishments in South Dakota